Kira García-Beltrán Miró (born March 13, 1980, in Santa Brígida, Las Palmas, Gran Canaria) is a Spanish actress and TV presenter. She is the daughter of Spanish businessman Jose García Beltrán, conocido de apodó Pepe, and Marta Miró, a Spanish famous film producer.

Filmography

As presenter
 Cuatrosfera (2005-)
 Desesperado Club Social

As actress
 Alpha Males (2022)
 Los abrazos rotos (2009)
 Rivales (2008)
 Gominolas (Seven episodes, 2007) - Susana / Menta
 Manhattan Pictures (short, 2007) - Andrea
 Isi Disi 2/ Alto Voltaje (2006) - Angie
 El próximo oriente
 Fuera de control (Episode: "Buscando un fiambre desesperadamente" (2006), - Sabrina
 Cuba libre (2005) -  Mar Paz
 Desde que amanece apetece (2005) - Claudia
 Crimen Ferpecto (2004) -  Roxanne
 Los Serrano (Episode: "La vuelta al cole" (2004), also as presenter returned for the fourth season (2006), -  Lola
  (2004) - Estrella
 Hospital Central (Episode: "Los trapos sucios" (2003), as Estela
 Slam (2003) - Lorena
 La soledad era esto (2002) Barbara
 Menos es más (2000) - María
 Desesperado club social (1999) - Sofía

References

External links

1980 births
Living people
People from Las Palmas
Spanish television presenters
Spanish women television presenters
Actresses from the Canary Islands
21st-century Spanish actresses
Spanish television actresses
Spanish film actresses
Spanish people of British descent
Spanish people of Catalan descent